Waryah  (also known as Varya, Warya,Wariya and Varah) is a Hindu, Sikh and Muslim Rajput clan. Varãha, ruled at Chittor in the middle of the 10th century A.D. which can be inferred from the Bonai (Orissa) Plates of Maharaja Rāņaka Udayavarâha of a Maurya family which had migrated from Chitor. His predecessors on the throne were Tejavarāha and Uditavarāha.

They are largely inhabited in the Punjab and Sindh provinces of Pakistan and in the states of Punjab, Himachal Pradesh and Gujarat in India. 
They are mostly located in Banni, Mandvi, Bhuj, Mundra regions of Kutch, India.
In Tando Adam Khan, Sanghar District, Bachal Varya, Karachi, interior of Sindh, Dera Ghazi Khan District, Sialkot, Daska, Gujranwala and Faisalabad District of Pakistan.

History and origin

Varhas, ruled over the frontier parts of the country (including Kabul) and at that time their rulers with the title of Tegin were known as Turki Shahis. Perhaps after the capture of their power by their ministers, they were known as Hindu Shahis and they had settled around the regions of Bhatinda and Talwandi in Punjab. Varhas as political entity survived until the period of the establishment of the Turkish Sultanate at Delhi. Perhaps after the defeat of Prithviraj Chauhan and his allies from the hands of Sultan of Ghurid empire these Varhas also ceased to remain in power in the central and lower parts of Punjab. They might have continued to remain in authority at the village or local level but their position remained dependent upon the mercy of the Iqta or Pargana authorities. And a majority of them might have turned towards agriculture.
Abu'l-Fazl ibn Mubarak in his Ain has shown the presence of Varhas in the Mahals of Sarhind, Sumana, Karyat Rae Samu and Machhiwara of Sarkar Sarhind of Subah Delhi and Mahals of Bajwara, Dardak, Rahimabad and Sankarbanot of Sarkar Bet Jalandhar Doab of Subah Lahore.

The village of Waryah in Kapurthala district is named after the clan.
The Varya community use the Punjabi, Kutchi and Saraiki languages.
A Significant population of Varyas are found in Punjab in Faisalabad, Gujrat, Gujranwala, Sahiwal, Dera Ghazi Khan and other Districts of Punjab.

Population

They are mostly Sunni Muslims.
They use the title Rana as surname.

References

Social groups of Gujarat
Tribes of Kutch
Maldhari communities
Muslim communities of India
Sindhi tribes

Sindhi tribes in India
Muslim communities of Gujarat